Waynedale High School is a public high school in Apple Creek, Ohio, United States.  It is the only high school in the Southeast Local School District. They are nicknamed the "Golden Bears" and wear the colors of brown and gold for athletic events.

History 
Waynedale was created in 1955 during the era when the state of Ohio was consolidating small school districts into larger ones in order to save money.  Apple Creek, Fredericksburg, Holmesville, and Mt. Eaton high schools were merged to create Waynedale High School within the Southeast Local School District.  They have been members of the Wayne County Athletic League since their creation, as their preceding schools were beforehand.  A 20-member committee of coaches, students, and teachers chose the name "Waynedale", as well as the nickname "Bears" over the other choices of "Warriors" and "Wabbits".  When the school colors of brown and gold were selected, they decided to go with the nickname of "Golden Bears."  The Waynedale student section during athletic events is called the "Bear Den".

Waynedale has a strong rivalry with the Triway High School Titans that dates back to when both schools were members of the WCAL from 1955-1970.

Due to the recent success of all three teams, Waynedale's football team also has a strong rivalry with both the Dalton High School Bulldogs and the Smithville High School Smithies.  All three schools have combined to either share or outright win the WCAL football title 44 times from 1960-2019, and in that time frame there have only been 16 seasons where none of the three have contributed to a football championship.

Ohio High School Athletic Association State Championships

Baseball: 2022 (D-III)
Wrestling: 2012 (D-III)

References

External links
 District Website

High schools in Wayne County, Ohio
Public high schools in Ohio